Aframomum spiroligulatum is a species of plant in the ginger family, Zingiberaceae. It was first described by John Michael Lock and Axel Dalberg Poulsen.

Range
Aframomum spiroligulatum is native from Southwest Uganda to Southwest Rwanda.

References 

spiroligulatum